Glaciology is the scientific study of glaciers, or more generally ice and natural phenomena that involve ice.

Glaciology is an interdisciplinary Earth science that integrates geophysics, geology, physical geography, geomorphology, climatology, meteorology, hydrology, biology, and ecology. The impact of glaciers on people includes the fields of human geography and anthropology. The discoveries of water ice on the Moon, Mars, Europa and Pluto add an extraterrestrial component to the field, which is referred to as "astroglaciology".

Overview

A glacier is an extended mass of ice formed from snow falling and accumulating over a long period of time; glaciers move very slowly, either descending from high mountains, as in valley glaciers, or moving outward from centers of accumulation, as in continental glaciers.

Areas of study within glaciology include glacial history and the reconstruction of past glaciation. A glaciologist is a person who studies glaciers. A glacial geologist studies glacial deposits and glacial erosive features on the landscape. Glaciology and glacial geology are key areas of polar research.

Types

Glaciers can be identified by their geometry and the relationship to the surrounding topography. There are two general categories of glaciation which glaciologists distinguish: alpine glaciation, accumulations or "rivers of ice" confined to valleys; and continental glaciation, unrestricted accumulations which once covered much of the northern continents.

Alpine – ice flows down the valleys of mountainous areas and forms a tongue of ice moving towards the plains below. Alpine glaciers tend to make topography more rugged by adding and improving the scale of existing features. Various features include large ravines called cirques and arêtes, which are ridges where the rims of two cirques meet. 
Continental – an ice sheet found today, only in high latitudes (Greenland/Antarctica), thousands of square kilometers in area and thousands of meters thick. These tend to smooth out the landscapes.

Zones of glaciers
Accumulation zone – where the formation of ice is faster than its removal.
Ablation (or wastage) zone – when the sum of melting, calving, and evaporation (sublimation) is greater than the amount of snow added each year.

Glacier equilibrium line and ELA
The glacier equilibrium line is the line separating the glacial accumulation area above from the ablation area below. 
The equilibrium line altitude (ELA) and its change over the years is a key indicator of the health of a glacier. A long term monitoring of the ELA may be used as indication to climate change.

Movement

When a glacier is experiencing an accumulation input by precipitation (snow or refreezing rain) that exceeds the output by ablation, the glacier shows a positive glacier mass balance and will advance. Conversely, if the loss of volume (from evaporation, sublimation, melting, and calving) exceeds the accumulation, the glacier shows a negative glacier mass balance and the glacier will melt back. During times in which the volume input to the glacier by precipitation is equivalent to the ice volume lost from calving, evaporation, and melting, the glacier has a steady-state condition.

Some glaciers show periods where the glacier is advancing at an extreme rate, that is typically 100 times faster than what is considered normal, it is referred to as a surging glacier. Surge periods may occur at an interval of 10 to 15 years, e.g. on Svalbard. This is caused mainly due to a long lasting accumulation period on subpolar glaciers frozen to the ground in the accumulation area. When the stress due to the additional volume in the accumulation area increases, the pressure melting point of the ice at its base may be reached, the basal glacier ice will melt, and the glacier will surge on a film of meltwater.

Rate of movement 
The movement of glaciers is usually slow. Its velocity varies from a few centimeters to a few meters per day. The rate of movement depends upon the factors listed below:
 Temperature of the ice. A polar glacier shows cold ice with temperatures well below the freezing point from its surface to its base. It is frozen to its bed. A temperate glacier is at a melting point temperature throughout the year, from its surface to its base. This allows the glacier to slide on a thin layer of meltwater. Most glaciers in alpine regions are temperate glaciers.
 Gradient of the slope. 
 Thickness of the glacier
 Subglacial water dynamics

Glacial Terminology 

 Ablation  Wastage of the glacier through sublimation, ice melting and iceberg calving.
 Ablation zone Area of a glacier in which the annual loss of ice through ablation exceeds the annual gain from precipitation.
 Arête An acute ridge of rock where two cirques meet.
 Bergschrund  Crevasse formed near the head of a glacier, where the mass of ice has rotated, sheared and torn itself apart in the manner of a geological fault.
 Cirque, Corrie or cwm  Bowl shaped depression excavated by the source of a glacier.
 Creep  Adjustment to stress at a molecular level.
 Flow  Movement (of ice) in a constant direction.
 Fracture  Brittle failure (breaking of ice) under the stress raised when movement is too rapid to be accommodated by creep. It happens, for example, as the central part of a glacier moves faster than the edges.
 Moraine  Accumulated debris that has been carried by a glacier and deposited at its sides (lateral moraine) or at its foot (terminal moraine).
 Névé  Area at the top of a glacier (often a cirque) where snow accumulates and feeds the glacier.
 Horn  Spire of rock, also known as a pyramidal peak, formed by the headward erosion of three or more cirques around a single mountain. It is an extreme case of an arête.
 Plucking/Quarrying  Where the adhesion of the ice to the rock is stronger than the cohesion of the rock, part of the rock leaves with the flowing ice.
 Tarn  A post-glacial lake in a cirque. 
 Tunnel valley  The tunnel that is formed by hydraulic erosion of ice and rock below an ice sheet margin. The tunnel valley is what remains of it in the underlying rock when the ice sheet has melted.

Glacial deposits

Stratified
Outwash sand/gravel From front of glaciers, found on a plain.
 Kettles When a lock of stagnant ice leaves a depression or pit.
 Eskers Steep sided ridges of gravel/sand, possibly caused by streams running under stagnant ice.
 Kames Stratified drift builds up low, steep hills.
 Varves Alternating thin sedimentary beds (coarse and fine) of a proglacial lake. Summer conditions deposit more and coarser material and those of the winter, less and finer.

Unstratified

 Till-unsorted (Glacial flour to boulders) deposited by receding/advancing glaciers, forming moraines, and drumlins.
 Moraines  (Terminal) material deposited at the end; (ground) material deposited as glacier melts; (lateral) material deposited along the sides.
 Drumlins Smooth elongated hills composed of till.
 Ribbed moraines Large subglacial elongated hills transverse to former ice flow.

See also

Continental Glaciation
Ice cap
International Glaciological Society
International Association of Cryospheric Sciences
Irish Sea Glacier
List of glaciers
Cryosphere

Notes

Further reading
Benn, Douglas I. and David J. A. Evans. Glaciers and Glaciation. London; Arnold, 1998. 
Greve, Ralf and Heinz Blatter. Dynamics of Ice Sheets and Glaciers. Berlin etc.; Springer, 2009. 
Hambrey, Michael and Jürg Alean. Glaciers. 2nd ed. Cambridge and New York; Cambridge University Press, 2004. 
Hooke, Roger LeB. Principles of Glacier Mechanics. 2nd ed. Cambridge and New York; Cambridge University Press, 2005. 
Paterson, W. Stanley B. The Physics of Glaciers. 3rd ed. Oxford etc.; Pergamon Press, 1994. 
van der Veen, Cornelis J. Fundamentals of Glacier Dynamics. Rotterdam; A. A. Balkema, 1999. 
van der Veen, Cornelis J. Fundamentals of Glacier Dynamics. 2nd ed. Boca Raton, FL; CRC Press, 2013.

External links

International Glaciological Society (IGS)
International Association of Cryospheric Sciences (IACS)
Snow, Ice, and Permafrost Group, University of Alaska Fairbanks
Arctic and Alpine Research Group, University of Alberta
Glaciers online
World Data Centre for Glaciology, Cambridge, UK
National Snow and Ice Data Center, Boulder, Colorado
Global Land Ice Measurements from Space (GLIMS)
Glacial structures – photo atlas
 North Cascade Glacier Climate Project
Centre for Glaciology, University of Wales
Caltech Glaciology Group
Glaciology Group, University of Copenhagen
Institute of Low Temperature Science, Sapporo
National Institute of Polar Research, Tokyo
Glaciology Group, University of Washington
Glaciology Laboratory, Universidad de Chile-Centro de Estudios Científicos, Valdivia
 Russian Geographical Society (Moscow Centre) – Glaciology Commission
 Institute of Meteorology and Geophysics, Univ. of Innsbruck, Austria.